Richard Gheel (born 13 November 1968) is an Irish former swimmer. He competed in three events at the 1988 Summer Olympics.

References

External links
 

1968 births
Living people
Irish male swimmers
Olympic swimmers of Ireland
Swimmers at the 1988 Summer Olympics
Place of birth missing (living people)
20th-century Irish people
21st-century Irish people